Opharus aurogutta is a moth of the family Erebidae. It was described by William Schaus in 1896. It is found in Colombia.

References

Opharus
Moths described in 1896
Moths of South America